Mano is both a given name and a surname. Notable people with the name include:

Given name
 Mano (Mozambican footballer) (born 1984), real name Celso Halilo de Abdul
 Mano (Portuguese footballer) (born 1987), real name Luís Miguel Lopes Mendes
 Mano (singer) (born 1965), stage name of Indian playback singer Nagoor Babu
 Major Mano, a senior Tamil Tigers commander
 Manó Andrássy (1821-1891), Hungarian painter, caricaturist, collector, traveler and politician
 Mano Brown, vocalist from Racionais MC's
 Mano Dayak (1949-1995), Tuareg leader
 Mano Ganesan (born 1959), Sri Lankan politician
 Manó Kogutowicz (1851-1908), Hungarian cartographer
 Mano Menezes (born 1962), Brazilian football coach
 Manó Széchényi (1858-1926), Hungarian politician
 Mano Wijeyeratne (1957-2011), Sri Lankan politician

Surname
 Eloisa Biasotto Mano (1924–2019), Brazilian chemist, professor
 Erina Mano (born 1991), the solo artist for Hello!Project
, Japanese gymnast
 Mordechai Mano (1922-1969), Israeli businessman
 Yukari Mano (born 1994), Japanese field hockey player

See also
 Mano (disambiguation)

Japanese-language surnames